Vitapu Balasubrahmanyam is an Indian politician from the state of Andhra Pradesh. He is currently a member of the Andhra Pradesh Legislative Council, and was formerly its pro tem Speaker.

Early life and education
Vitapu Balasubrahmanyam was born on 30 June 1950 in Mamuduru village in Nellore district. He completed his M.A. in Telugu language from Sri Venkateswara University in Tirupati, Andhra Pradesh.

Political career
Balasubrahmanyam won his first election as MLC from Prakasam-Nellore-Chittoor Teachers constituency in 2007. In 2011 he won his second election. In 2017 he won his third election. He was appointed pro-tem chairman from June 2021 to November 2021.

References

People from Nellore
People from Nellore district
Members of the Andhra Pradesh Legislative Council
1950 births
Living people